The Rock Springs Formation is a geologic formation in Wyoming. It preserves fossils dating back to the Cretaceous period.

See also

 List of fossiliferous stratigraphic units in Wyoming
 Paleontology in Wyoming

References
 

Cretaceous geology of Wyoming